Cromwell is an English surname which comes from the village Cromwell, Nottinghamshire.

People with this surname include:
 Adelaide M. Cromwell (1919–2019), American sociologist and historian
 Chad Cromwell (born 1957) American drummer
 Dean Cromwell (1879–1962), American athletic coach
 Elizabeth Cromwell (1598–1665), wife of Oliver Cromwell
 George Cromwell (1860–1934), New York politician
 Gregory Cromwell, 1st Baron Cromwell (c. 1514 – 1551), son of Thomas Cromwell
 Henry Cromwell, 2nd Baron Cromwell (1538–1592), son of Gregory Cromwell
 Henry Williams (alias Cromwell) (1537–1604), Member of Parliament, son of Richard Williams (alias Cromwell)
 Henry Cromwell (1628–1674), Lord Deputy of Ireland, son of Oliver Cromwell
 James Cromwell (born 1940), American actor
 James H. R. Cromwell (1896–1990), American diplomat
 John Cromwell (1887–1979), American film actor, director, and producer
 John P. Cromwell (1901–1943), US Navy Medal of Honor recipient
 Keith Cromwell (born 1979), American professional lacrosse player
 Nolan Cromwell (born 1955), American football player
 Oliver Cromwell (1599–1658), Lord Protector of England, Scotland and Ireland 1653–58, great-great nephew of Thomas Cromwell
 Other persons and items named Oliver Cromwell, see Oliver Cromwell (disambiguation)
 Richard Cromwell (1626–1712), Lord Protector of England, Scotland and Ireland 1658–59, son of Oliver Cromwell
 Ralph de Cromwell, 1st Baron Cromwell (died 1398), English peer
 Ralph Cromwell, 3rd Baron Cromwell (c. 1393 – 1456), English politician and diplomat
 Richard Cromwell (1910–1960), an American actor
 Richard Williams (alias Cromwell)
 Thomas Cromwell, 1st Earl of Essex (c. 1485 – 1540), English statesman in the reign of Henry VIII of England
 Thomas Cromwell (Canadian jurist) (born 1952), Canadian judge
 Townsend Cromwell (1922–1958), American oceanographer
 William Nelson Cromwell (1854–1948), American attorney and co-founder of law firm Sullivan & Cromwell

People with the given name Cromwell include:
 Cromwell Dixon (1892–1911), American aviation pioneer
 Cromwell Everson (1925–1991), Afrikaans and South African composer

References

English-language surnames
English toponymic surnames